Houblon's Almshouses are Grade II* listed almshouses in Richmond, London. They were founded in the 18th century by two sisters, Rebecca and Susanna Houblon, whose father, Sir John Houblon, had been  the first Governor of the Bank of England. The oldest almshouses were built in 1757, originally to house nine poor women who had been brought up in the Protestant religion. A further two almshouses were built in 1857. 

The almshouses are now managed by The Richmond Charities. New residents are accepted from 65 years of age.

See also
List of almshouses in the United Kingdom
Richmond Charities

Notes and references

External links
The Richmond Charities

1757 establishments in England
Almshouses in Richmond, London
Grade II* listed almshouses
History of the London Borough of Richmond upon Thames
Residential buildings completed in 1757
Residential buildings completed in 1857